Saint-Michel-des-Saints Aerodrome  is located  west of Saint-Michel-des-Saints, Quebec, Canada.

References

Registered aerodromes in Lanaudière